Javesella pellucida is a species of insect in the family Delphacidae. It is found in most of Europe, China, Georgia, India, Japan, Kazakhstan, Kyrgyzstan, Mongolia, Turkey, Uzbekistan, Algeria, Libya, Morocco, most of North America, Central America, Cuba and Puerto Rico.

Males are much darker than females. They have translucent forewings, which are normally slightly brownish or whitish. Adults reach a length of about 3 mm. They can be found from April to October.

The species feeds on Oryza sativa and Lolium multiflorum.

References

External links
 Images

Insects described in 1794
Hemiptera of Africa
Hemiptera of Asia
Delphacini